Psilogramma manusensis is a moth of the  family Sphingidae. It is known from the Admiralty Islands of Papua New Guinea.

References

Psilogramma
Moths described in 2010
Endemic fauna of Papua New Guinea